The Copa América is South America's major tournament in senior men's soccer and determines the continental champion. Until 1967, the tournament was known as South American Championship. It is the oldest continental championship in the world with its first edition held in 1916.

Bolivia participated for the first time in 1926, but it took 23 years (26 matches) until their first victory.

1963 was a special year for Bolivia in tournament history. The country not only hosted the South American Championship for the first time. The two host cities, Cochabamba and La Paz, both lie in Andean valleys and are at a much higher altitude than large parts of the continent. With the thin air as a major home advantage, Bolivia won the tournament unbeaten and earned their first and only international title. Forward Ramiro Blacut is the only Bolivian to be awarded an individual trophy when he was honoured as best player of the tournament that same year.

With a notable exception in 1997, when Bolivia reached the final in their second-ever home tournament, the team has been hugely unsuccessful in the past decades. From 1999 to 2021, they only won a single match (3–2 vs Ecuador in 2015).

Overall record

Bolivia missed out on the first nine South American championships (1916–1925) because the FBF was only founded in 1926.

1963 South American Championship

Bolivia played their first match of the tournament against Ecuador. After they had given away an early 2–0 leading to a 2–4 deficit after 50 minutes, the match ended in a 4–4 draw. Subsequently, the Bolivian hosts won their matches against Colombia (2–1), Peru (3–2), Paraguay (2–0) and Argentina (3–2).

The table after five out of six match days looked as follows.

Still to play:
 - ,
 - ,
 - 

Because a victory gave two points at the time, only Paraguay was able to put pressure on Bolivia on the last day of the tournament. In case of equal points, a play-off would have been held. In order to secure the title, Bolivia would have to earn at least as many points in their match against Brazil as Paraguay would in their match against Argentina.

The Paraguay match in La Paz ended 1–1, which meant Bolivia also needed at least a draw.

Match details

In spite of Brazil equalizing a two-goal lead twice, Bolivia secured the victory and the tournament title, two points ahead of Paraguay.

Record by opponent

Bolivia's highest victory at a Copa América is a 4–0 win against Colombia in 1949. A 1–10 defeat against Brazil in the same tournament, along with a 0–9 defeat against Uruguay at the 1927 edition, are Bolivia's highest defeats of all time.

* Includes a 2–2 draw awarded to Chile in 1953.

Record players

Top goalscorers

Awards and records

Team Awards
 Champions 1x (1963)
 Second Place 1x (1997)

Individual Awards
 MVP 1963: Ramiro Blacut

Team Records

 Victory with highest amount of goals conceded (5–4 vs Brazil, 31 March 1963. Tied with Brazil 6–4 Chile in 1937).
 Highest draw (4–4 vs Ecuador, 10 March 1963)

References

External links
RSSSF archives and results
Soccerway database

Countries at the Copa América
Bolivia national football team